The 2004 House elections in Kentucky occurred on November 2, 2004, to elect the members of the State of Kentucky's delegation to the United States House of Representatives. Kentucky had six seats in the House, apportioned according to the 2000 United States Census.

These elections occurred simultaneously with the United States Senate elections of 2004 (including one in Kentucky), the United States House elections in other states, and various state and local elections.

Though Democrats picked up a seat via a special election in the Sixth congressional district in February of that year, but this was later cancelled out by a victory for Republicans in the Fourth district.

Overview

District 1

Incumbent Republican Congressman Ed Whitfield defeated Democratic challenger Billy Cartwright by a solid margin in this solidly-conservative west Kentucky-based district.

District 2

Incumbent Republican Congressman Ron Lewis faced no difficulty seeking a fifth term in his conservative district based in west-central Kentucky, riding the coattails of President Bush's re-election in Kentucky over Democratic nominee Adam Smith.

District 3

Incumbent Republican Congresswoman Anne Northup was used to facing tough elections in this swing district based in Louisville, but this election proved different. Despite the fact that John Kerry, the Democratic nominee for president, won Northup's district, her Democratic opponent, Tony Miller, the Circuit Court Clerk for Jefferson County was unable to defeat Northup and his campaign crumbled in a landslide.

District 4

When  incumbent Congressman Ken Lucas, a Democrat, declined to seek re-election as part of a campaign pledge to only serve three terms, an intense battle emerged in this conservative district based in northern Kentucky. Reporter Nick Clooney, the father of renowned actor George Clooney, became the Democratic nominee; Geoff Davis, Lucas's opponent in 2002, became the Republican nominee. In what some dubbed "Heartland vs. Hollywood," Davis rode a Republican tidal wave to victory, defeating Clooney by a fair margin. Michael E. Slider, a High School teacher from Oldham County, also ran in the race as an Independent.

District 5

Incumbent Republican Congressman Hal Rogers was unopposed for another term in this strongly conservative district based in East Kentucky.

District 6

Emerging from a successful special election earlier in the year, freshman incumbent Congressman Ben Chandler faced off against the Republican nominee, Kentucky State Senator Tom Buford. Chandler won a second term with relative ease in this conservative Central Kentucky district.

References

Kentucky
2004
2004 Kentucky elections